Mike Carroll is a member of the Irvine City Council in Irvine, California, as well as the Chairman of the Orange County Great Park and the former Vice Mayor. Before joining the city council, Carroll served as Vice Chair of the Irvine Planning Commission and as Chair of the Community Services (Parks & Recreation) Commission. Carroll was a bi-partisan appointment to fill a council vacancy in May 2019, and in November 2020 he won a 4-year term as Councilmember, receiving the second highest number of votes in the City’s history.

Political Career

Appointment 
In 2019, Donald P. Wagner, the mayor of Irvine, California at the time, became a member of the Orange County Board of Supervisors. As a result, Christina Shea, a current member of Irvine City Council, was promoted to the position of mayor. This left an opening on the City Council, which was filled when the remaining members of the City Council appointed Mike Carroll to the position.

Attempted Recall 
Near the end of 2019, a petition was started to recall Irvine Mayor Christina Shea and Councilmember Carroll. The recall effort was suspended in early 2020 due to the COVID-19 pandemic and no recall election was held. The Mayor and Councilmember claimed the petition was a campaign effort by a political opponent preparing for a run in the 2020 elections. Ultimately, the recall effort failed and was abandoned.

City Mailer Spending 
In September 2020, Councilwoman Melissa Fox, filed a complaint to the City Council stating that in the last year, Councilman Mike Carroll had spent $70,000 on city mailers. Similar to events held by federal, state, and county elected officials, the mailers promoted neighborhood town hall meetings attended by residents and featured Carroll's name. The California Fair Political Practices Commission, dismissed all claims and rejected any investigation into the complaint.

References 

California city council members
California Republicans
Living people
People from Irvine, California
Year of birth missing (living people)
Place of birth missing (living people)